Love Comes Along is a 1930 American romantic film directed by Rupert Julian, written by Wallace Smith, based on the uncompleted play Conchita by Edward Knoblock. It was a vehicle specifically picked to highlight the vocal talents of Bebe Daniels, which also starred Lloyd Hughes and Montagu Love. It made a profit of $258,000.

An incomplete print has long been preserved in the Library of Congress collection.

Plot
An actress, Peggy, is stranded on the island of Caparoja, which is ruled by a local dictator, Sangredo. For a living, she sings in the local tavern, where she is seen by two sailors from a tramp steamer who are visiting the port, Johnny and Happy.  Johnny falls in love with Peggy and plans to marry her, rescuing her from her exile.  However, Sangredo hires Peggy to perform at a party he is throwing, when the original singer, Carlotta, backs out.  When Johnny finds out about the agreement, he misunderstands their relationship, and blows up at her.  Peggy gets furious in turn over the fact he could believe that about her, and calls the wedding off.

At the party, Peggy relents, and sings a love song directly to Johnny, which angers Sangredo.  He orders that Johnny be arrested, but Peggy steps forward to intercede on his behalf.  She offers to spend the night with Sangredo, if he will release Johnny and let him sail with his steamer.  He agrees, and Johnny is escorted to his ship.  However, Johnny and Happy, sneak back to the town and break Peggy out of Sangredo's house.  Fleeing, they board the steamer, escaping from the island.

Cast
 Bebe Daniels as Peggy
 Lloyd Hughes as Johnny
 Montagu Love as Sangredo
 Ned Sparks as Happy
 Lionel Belmore as Brownie
 Alma Tell as Carlotta
 Evelyn Selbie as Bianca
 Sam Appel as Gómez

Songs
 "Night Winds" - performed by Bebe Daniels
 "Until Love Comes Along" - performed by Bebe Daniels
 "I Am a Simple Maid" - performed by Bebe Daniels
 "A Sailor's Life" - Performed by Lloyd Hughes; reprised by Bebe Daniels and Lloyd Hughes

Reception
With a lower budget, audiences noted the drop in production quality in Love Comes Along when compared to Daniels' prior successful film Rio Rita (1929), but they did enjoy her songs.

Notes
This film is based on the play Conchita by Edward Knoblock, which according to his papers, which are saved on the campus of Harvard University in the rare books collection in the Houghton Library, was never completed, with only an outline existing.

The film is also known by its Italian title, Ecco l'amore!

References

External links

1930 films
American romantic musical films
1930s romantic musical films
American black-and-white films
RKO Pictures films
American films based on plays
Films directed by Rupert Julian
1930s American films
1930s English-language films